The Northern Railway Bridge is a Truss bridge over the Danube in Vienna, Austria. It is one of two railway crossings within the city, the other being the Stadtlauer Eastern Railway Bridge. The bridge is a double track Parker truss bridge with 4 spans connecting the municipalities of Brigittenau and Floridsdorf.

References

Bridges over the Danube
Bridges in Austria
Transport in Vienna